The Azalea Stakes is a race for Thoroughbred horses once run at Calder Race Course in Miami Gardens, Florida on the Summit of Speed Day each year. Since 2015, the Azalea is now run at Gulfstream Park due to racing negotiations between the two Florida racetracks. Inaugurated in 1975 as the Azalea Handicap, the race is open to three-year-old fillies willing to race seven furlongs on the dirt. The listed race carries a purse of $100,000.

The race has been run at a variety of distances:
 6 furlongs - 1976–1977, 1980, 1997–2013
 6.5 furlongs - 1991
 7 furlongs - 1978–1979, 1981–1990, 1992–1996, 2015–present

Winners since 1995
 2016 - Dearest (Emisael Jaramillo)
 2015 - Dogwood Trail (Jesus M. Rios)
 2014 - NOT RUN
 2013 - Wildcat Lily (Jose L. Alvarez)
 2012 - Another Romance (Luca Panici)
 2011 - Devilish Lady (Daniel Centeno)
 2010 - Pica Slew
 2009 - First Passage (Jermaine Bridgmohan)
 2008 - Indyanne (Russell Baze)
 2007 - Sheets (Robby Albarado)
 2006 - Victorina
 2005 - Leave Me Alone
 2004 - Dazzle Me
 2003 - Ebony Breeze
 2002 - Bold World
 2001 - Hattiesburg (Mark Guidry)
 2000 - Swept Away
 1999 - Show Me The Stage
 1998 - Cassidly
 1997 - Little Sister
 1996 - J J's Dream
 1995 - Lucky Lavender Gal

References

External links
 Signature races switch tracks
 Calder Race Course website

Graded stakes races in the United States
Sprint category horse races for fillies and mares
Horse races in Florida
Gulfstream Park
Recurring sporting events established in 1975
1975 establishments in Florida